South Korea, as Korea, competed at the 1960 Summer Olympics in Rome, Italy. 35 competitors, 33 men and 2 women, took part in 38 events in 9 sports.

Athletics

Track and road

Field

Boxing

Cycling

Road Competition

Track Competition

Diving

Equestrian

Gymnastics

Men

Women

Shooting

Three shooters represented South Korea in 1960.
Men

Weightlifting

Wrestling

References

External links
Official Olympic Reports

Korea, South
1960
1960 in South Korean sport